Deo Gracia Ngokaba (born 17 May 1997) is a Congolese judoka.

He competed at the 2016 Summer Olympics in Rio de Janeiro, in the men's +100 kg, where he was eliminated by Roy Meyer in the second round.

References

1997 births
Living people
Republic of the Congo male judoka
Olympic judoka of the Republic of the Congo
Judoka at the 2016 Summer Olympics
African Games bronze medalists for the Republic of the Congo
African Games medalists in judo
Competitors at the 2015 African Games